Somatochlora taiwana is a species of dragonfly in the family Corduliidae. It is endemic to Taiwan, and is the only member of the genus Somatochlora found there. It is a metallic green to black dragonfly with yellow spots, and measures about 35 mm long. It is closely related to S. shennong and S. dido, and is sometimes treated as conspecific with the latter species.

Another population has been discovered later on.

References

Corduliidae
Odonata of Asia
Insects of Taiwan
Endemic fauna of Taiwan
Insects described in 2001